The 2016 Idaho Vandals football team represented the University of Idaho in the 2016 NCAA Division I FBS football season. They were led by fourth-year head coach Paul Petrino and played their home games at Kibbie Dome in Moscow, Idaho. They were invited to the Famous Idaho Potato Bowl in Boise, where they defeated Colorado State.

Schedule
Idaho announced their 2016 football schedule on March 3, with five of the twelve games at home.

Game summaries

Montana State

at Washington

at Washington State

at UNLV

Troy

at Louisiana–Monroe

New Mexico State

at Appalachian State

at Louisiana–Lafayette

at Texas State

South Alabama

Georgia State

vs. Colorado State–Famous Idaho Potato Bowl

References

Idaho
Idaho Vandals football seasons
Famous Idaho Potato Bowl champion seasons
Idaho Vandals football